Canarium australianum is a species of trees, native to Australia and Papua New Guinea, of the plant family Burseraceae. Common names include mango bark, scrub turpentine, carrot wood, parsnip wood, Melville Island white beech and brown cudgerie.

Three varieties are recognised in the Australian Plant Census:
C. australianum F.Muell. var. australianum
C. australianum var. glabrum Leenh. — styptic tree, jalgir (Bardi language) — type specimen from Bickerton Island in the Gulf of Carpentaria
C. australianum var. velutinum Hewson —jalgir (Bardi language) — type specimen from Cape Domett, north of Kununurra, Western Australia

In Australia trees of all three varieties grow naturally widespread across northern regions, from sea level up to about  altitude. In particular, growing in the Kimberley region of Western Australia, the Arnhem Land region of the Northern Territory, in north-eastern Queensland in the Wet Tropics region, further southwards from there as far as about Airlie Beach and further north in Cape York Peninsula and the Torres Strait Islands.

References

External links
 
 
 Natural Assets Database: Canarium australianum

Australianum
Sapindales of Australia
Rosids of Western Australia
Flora of the Northern Territory
Flora of Queensland
Flora of Papua New Guinea
Taxa named by Ferdinand von Mueller